David Wright Allison (1826 in Adolphustown, Upper Canada – May 15, 1906) was a Canadian politician, farmer, manufacturer, and speculator. He was elected to the House of Commons of Canada as a Liberal in an 1883 by-election representing the riding of Lennox. He was later elected to Lennox as a Liberal in 1891. He also ran for election as an independent for Lennox in the elections of 1882, by-election of 1885, 1887 and by-election of 1892.

External links 
 

1826 births
1906 deaths
Liberal Party of Canada MPs
Members of the House of Commons of Canada from Ontario